The 2011 UMass Minutemen football team represented the University of Massachusetts Amherst in the 2011 NCAA Division I FCS football season as a member of the Colonial Athletic Association. The team was coached by Kevin Morris and played its home games at Warren McGuirk Alumni Stadium in Hadley, Massachusetts, with the exception of the second annual Colonial Clash, which was played at Gillette Stadium.

The 2011 season was the team's last as a member of the CAA, as they began their transition to NCAA Division I FBS play.  Because of this, they were ineligible for post season play.

They finished the season 5–6, with a 3–5 record against members of the CAA. They did not occupy a spot in the CAA standings due to their transition to the FBS.

Two days after the final game of the season, Kevin Morris was fired from his position as head coach.

Schedule
Highlights of the 2011 schedule, which was the final FCS schedule for the Minutemen, included:

The season opening night game at in-state rival Holy Cross.
A game against FBS and in-state rival Boston College.
The Colonial Clash matchup against New Hampshire at Gillette Stadium.
The final game at McGuirk Stadium for the immediate future against James Madison.

References

UMass
UMass Minutemen football seasons
UMass Minutemen football